Sollefteå Hospital is a hospital in Sollefteå in Västernorrland County, Sweden. The hospital was the first site to use an automated vacuum collection system, with the first system installed in 1961.

References

External links 
 Hospital website

Hospitals in Sweden
1873 establishments in Sweden
Hospitals established in 1873
Sollefteå